Francis Chibuike (born 6 June 1993) is a football player from Nigeria. He currently plays for the Finnish Ykkönen side, Mikkelin Palloilijat.

References

1993 births
Living people
Nigerian footballers
Association football forwards
Kuopion Palloseura players
Mikkelin Palloilijat players